Stanisław Chodecki (z Chodcza - of Chodecz) of Ogończyk coat of arms (died 1529) was a Polish military commander (hetman) from  1492 to 1499 and 1501 to 1505 and also a marshal.

15th-century births
1529 deaths
Field Crown Hetmans
16th-century Polish nobility
15th-century Polish nobility